Reuben Ottenberg (1882 in New York City – 1959) was an American physician and haematologist, who served Mount Sinai Hospital in New York City with distinction for 50 years.

He received his B.A. from Columbia University in 1902 and his M.D. degree from the College of Physicians and Surgeons three years later.

He published his groundbreaking paper on blood transfusion before World War I. In haemocompatibility tests, which he had started in 1907 he found out that patient antibodies against donor red cells could be harmful but not vice versa. This report led to the use of group O (“zero”) individuals as universal donors.

In 1954 Ottenberg was the first to be awarded the Karl Landsteiner Award from the
American Society of Blood Banks for "distinguished pioneering contributions to blood banking and hemotherapy."

References

1882 births
1959 deaths
American hematologists
Columbia University faculty
Columbia University alumni